Louis Aguettant (3 April 1871 – 10 March 1931) was a French musicologist, writer and teacher of French literature.

Biography 
Bachelor of letters in 1887 and of sciences in 1888, Bachelor of Arts in 1891, agrégé of the Sorbonne in 1895, musicologist, Louis Aguettant was professor of French literature at the Catholic Faculty of Lyon, a chair he kept until his death.

Music, poetry and literature 
He was a professor-lecturer of European culture, an outstanding artist and pianist as witnessed by Ignacy Paderewski who took an interest in him and considered that he had the stuff of "a talent of the first order."

Passionate about music he met Gabriel Fauré, Georges Martin Witkowski, maintained correspondence with Maurice Ravel and Claude Debussy, gave musicology lessons at the Conservatoire de Lyon and poetry, met Paul Claudel, Francis Jammes, Paul Valéry...

For 33 years, he left an irreplaceable imprint on his students. His courses on Paul Verlaine and Charles Baudelaire still testify to his penetrating thought.

In 1921, he married Marcelle Mouly who gave him three children: Jeanne, Louis and Robert.

Attentive to the literature of his time, he corresponded with the greatest of his time: Jean Cocteau, Paul Claudel, Gabriel Fauré, André Gide, Louis Mercier, Max Jacob, Henry de Montherlant, Charles Péguy, Raymond Radiguet, Albert Thibaudet, Paul Valéry and many others.

Among his works a good number were published: Les Dialogues de Paul Valéry, La Poésie de Paul Claudel, Un fils de Virgile : Louis Mercier, Jean-Marc Bernard, Marcel Ormoy, Émile Mâle, Le Génie de Gabriel Fauré, André Caplet, translation by Abt Vogler de Browning, etc.

The publication of his book La musique de piano, with a preface by Henri Rambaud was a powerful discovery, "a master book" for Bernard Gavoty, "A breviary" for Alfred Cortot and also 
"A wonder" for Émile Vuillermoz.

His finesse of analysis, his just judgment modeled on classicism, reflect his great sensitivity, knowing how to exalt poetic and musical beauty: "Artist to the depths of his being, in love with great painters, pianist of remarkable technique and personality in interpretation, he had an extraordinary faculty of emotion" (Mgr Lavallée).

His luxurious correspondence and intimate notebooks are a treasure in which all lovers and students of literature can find the formulas and analyzes of a language as perfect as spontaneous. In November 2003, the Lyon municipal library received the correspondence, notebooks and manuscripts fund, which can be consulted. In particular, there are five volumes of Notes biographiques (1.418 pages).

Quote 
« Un esprit de la plus grande rareté, car très rare sont ceux qui se développent comme lui sur les confins de la musique, des lettres et de l’abstrait » (Paul Valéry).

("A spirit of the greatest rarity, for very rare are those who develop like him on the confines of music, letters and the abstract")

Works 
1901: Victor Hugo paysagiste
1920: Ernest Psichari
1923: Les Dialogues de Paul Valéry
1925: Le Génie de Gabriel Fauré,
1934: Lettres de jeunesse
1954: La Musique de piano : des origines à Ravel
1957: Lecture de Baudelaire

References

External links 
 Louis Aguettant at L'Harmattan
 Louis Aguettant - La vie comme une œuvre d'art on Cultura
 Louis Aguettant on chopin.nifc.pl

20th-century French poets
20th-century French musicologists
1871 births
Writers from Lyon
1931 deaths